Beverley Grammar School is a boys’ day school secondary academy school in Beverley, East Riding of Yorkshire, England. A school may have been founded here about 700 AD and on that basis the school is claimed to be the country's oldest grammar school and the eighth oldest school overall, but the existence of a school here is not continuous. The present school  shares a joint Sixth form with Beverley High School. The school has received an 'Outstanding' in Ofsted inspections in 2006, 2008, and in 2010. However it was unable to sustain such a high level record when deemed 'requires improvement' in 2013. The school was re-awarded 'outstanding' in September 2021.
The current headteacher is Gavin Chappell, who took over from Gillian Todd in September 2015.

History
The date of the school’s foundation is unknown, but it has been supposed to be as old as Beverley Minster, with which it was associated for centuries. The exact date of the foundation of the Minster is also uncertain, but it was probably in existence by the tenth century. Ketell’s Miracles of St John, dating from around the year 1100, refers to a schoolmaster at Beverley. In 1306, the records of the chapter of the Minster record the appointment of a new master of the grammar school (scolas gramaticales ).

Masters of singing and grammar were employed at Beverley more or less continuously during the middle ages. The school disappeared at the time of the dissolution of the monasteries. In 1552, the burgesses of Beverley petitioned the Crown for land worth £60 for the maintenance of the Minster and also for the establishment of a new grammar school, as the town then had a population of about 5,000 but no school. It is unclear exactly when a new school was founded, but a schoolmaster is referred to in the town’s accounts for 1562, and in 1575 the town paid his whole salary.

In 1816/1817, the school moved away from the churchyard to a site next to the Schoolmaster’s house in Keldgate. Owing to lack of funds, it was closed in 1878, but a new school was founded in 1890 in Albert Terrace which also operated as a grammar school. It moved to Queensgate in 1902.

School site 

The school premises are located between Queensgate and Sloe Lane in Beverley.

The expressive arts block was completed in October 1999 and includes five English classrooms, music practice rooms, music teaching rooms and a drama studio. This was named after the former head of the school and the Chairman of Governors – Richard Michael Scrowston.

The sixth form block incorporating a sixth form common room, teaching rooms, an ICT room, a private study room and offices for staff was opened in 2004. However, since this time, this block has been turned into a Maths block, with the old Maths rooms being used for a larger office space, English and Business Studies teaching and a careers library.

The school is based in Beverley, England and the Beverley Westwood can be seen from its rear classrooms and Science Department.
The school's main building and reception are situated at the top of its drive with two main entrances at the front of the school site through its main gate and far path.

The building consists of two main structures and a cluster of subject specific buildings surrounding it.
The staff room, the main hall, Business Studies, the psychology classrooms and the Careers Room are situated in the main building. The Geography Department, Languages Section and a history room are in the smaller section of the main building. The Science Department are situated in both sections. Surrounding subjects are the Technology Department, the Maths Block, Sports Hall, Expressive Arts Department and the 6th form block.

Curriculum 

In the school's Joint Sixth form 98% achieved a pass with 52% achieving A*/A/B grades in A levels in 2013.

A quarter of all results were A or A*. The average point score per pupil is 812 points in 2013.

On 21 August 2014 the school announced on their website that 74% of their pupils had achieved an A* to C grade, additionally 1 in 4 of the pupils achieved 5A to A*.

Motto
The school motto, Adolescentiam alunt, senectutem oblectant, is taken from the Roman Statesman and writer Cicero's Pro Archia Poeta, a defence of the poet Aulus Licinius Archias against a charge of not being a Roman citizen. The full quote is Haec studia adolescentiam alunt, senectutem oblectant, secundas res ornant, adversis perfugium ac solacium praebent, delectant domi, non impediunt foris, pernoctant nobiscum, peregrinantur, rusticantur ("These studies sustain youth and entertain old age, they enhance prosperity, and offer a refuge and solace in adversity, they delight us when we are at home without hindering us in the wider world, and are with us at night, when we travel and when we visit the countryside.")

Houses
The school traditionally had a 4 house system (Conington, Minster, School and Fisher). In the 1980s the form groups were named after the four houses. In the 1990s the governors decided to increase the numbers in the school and move from a 4 Form system to a 5 form system. Burden House was then formed to fill the fifth house. The houses can be associated by their colours listed below.

 Burden – Yellow
Burden House was named after Henry Burden who was the Headmaster of the school between 1912 and 1935. He was largely seen as creating the modern school.
 Connington – Light Blue
John Conington (10 August 1825 – 23 October 1869) who was an English classical Scholar. He was born in Boston, Lincolnshire and was reputed to have been extremely clever learning the alphabet by fourteen months and being able to read at three and a half.
 Fisher – Dark Blue
Fisher House was named after the Catholic martyr John Fisher who was born in Beverley in 1469. He became a Vice Chancellor of Cambridge University.
 Minster – Red
Minster House was named after Beverley Minster and commemorates the founding of the school in 700 AD by St John of Beverley in Beverley Minster.
 School – Green
This was named after the original school which started inside the Minster and then was moved to a building in the Minster grounds. It later moved to a site in a larger building down Keldgate. In the 1890s it moved to this present site and was in the building that is now the Art Block. The Main school building was erected in the 1930s and has been considerably modernised and added to over the years.

Notable alumni

John Alcock (1430–1500), Lord Chancellor of England
John Andrew (1931–2014), Anglican clergyman in New York City
Ken Annakin (1914–2009), film director
Chris Fraser (1988), Animator on ITV hit Series Newzoids
Sir Hugh Cholmeley, 1st Baronet (1600–1657), soldier in the English Civil War
John Conington (1825–1869), English classical scholar
William Howe De Lancey (1778–1815), the Duke of Wellington's Chief of Staff at the Battle of Waterloo
Kyle Edmund (b. 1995), tennis player
Saint John Fisher (c. 1469–1535), Catholic bishop
Neil Mallender (b. 1961), England cricketer and international umpire
Thomas Percy (1560–1605), alleged Gunpowder plotter
Jim Ratcliffe (b. 1952), Chairman and CEO, Ineos, UK's richest man according to Sunday Times Rich List 2018.
Paul Robinson (b. 1979), football goalkeeper
Smithson Tennant (1761–1815), chemist
Tony Topham (1929–2004), British academic and writer

See also

List of the oldest schools in the world
List of schools in the East Riding of Yorkshire

References

External links

Beverley Grammar School website
2004 League table data
The School's house information

Boys' schools in the East Riding of Yorkshire
Educational institutions established in the 7th century
700 establishments
Academies in the East Riding of Yorkshire
7th-century establishments in England
Beverley
Secondary schools in the East Riding of Yorkshire
Specialist engineering colleges in England